Phenylhydrazine is the chemical compound with the formula . It is also found in edible mushrooms.

Properties 
Phenylhydrazine forms monoclinic prisms that melt to an oil around room temperature which may turn yellow to dark red upon exposure to air. Phenylhydrazine is miscible with ethanol, diethyl ether, chloroform and benzene. It is sparingly soluble in water.

Preparation 
Phenylhydrazine is prepared by oxidizing aniline with sodium nitrite in the presence of hydrogen chloride to form the diazonium salt, which is subsequently reduced using sodium sulfite in the presence of sodium hydroxide to form the final product.

History 
Phenylhydrazine was the first hydrazine derivative characterized, reported by Hermann Emil Fischer in 1875. He prepared it by reduction of a phenyl diazonium salt using sulfite salts. Fischer used phenylhydrazine to characterize sugars via formation of hydrazones known as osazones with the sugar aldehyde. He also demonstrated in this first paper many of the key properties recognized for hydrazines.

Uses 
Phenylhydrazine is used to prepare indoles by the Fischer indole synthesis, which are intermediates in the synthesis of various dyes and pharmaceuticals.

Phenylhydrazine is used to form phenylhydrazones of natural mixtures of simple sugars in order to render the differing sugars easily separable from each other.

This molecule is also used to induce acute hemolytic anemia in animal models.

Safety 
Exposure to phenylhydrazine may cause contact dermatitis, hemolytic anemia, and liver damage.

References

External links 
 
 PubChem
 Additional chemical properties of phenylhydrazine
 CDC - NIOSH Pocket Guide to Chemical Hazards

Hydrazines
Monoamine oxidase inhibitors
Emil Fischer
Phenyl compounds